The 2020 J3 League, referred to as the  for sponsorship reasons, was the 7th season of J3 League under its current name.

Blaublitz Akita won the J3 title for the second time in their history. They were promoted to the 2021 J2 League alongside SC Sagamihara. Both teams won promotion for the J2 League for the first time.

Overview 

On 19 March, the J.League announced no relegation would take place for the 2020 season, with the J1 League expanding to 20 clubs for the 2021 season.

This is last season to with three U-23 teams from J1 in 2020 season. J3 League has been scheduled for a reduction to 15 clubs before the 2021 season.

Postponement of the beginning of the season 

Due to the COVID-19 pandemic-related concerns, the Japan Football Association (JFA) opted to postpone the beginning of the season, firstly established for 7 March.

On 25 February, all J.League matches until 15 March were postponed in response to the COVID-19 pandemic. After that, it was announced that it would be postponed until 29 March. On March 19, the J.League announced no relegation would take place for the 2020 season, with the J1 League expanding to 20 clubs for the 2021 season. On 25 March, the league announced that the season would be suspended between 3 April and 6 May.

On 3 April, it was decided to start over with the official game schedule, which aimed to gradually resume J3 from 25 April, J2 from 2 May, and J1 from 9 May. Note that, considering a new schedule in the future, the schedule would have called for the season's resumption at least one month later and later in the month.

On 29 May, J.League announced its decision to resume on 27 June. On 9 June, the schedules of the 2020 season were published. On 15 June, new dates were also published. The first 2 matches in each league (J3 1st-2nd section) were held without spectators. After 10 July, as a general rule, the maximum number of people were 5,000 (stadiums with lower capacity are those with less than 50% of the capacity of people watching; no away supporters allowed). After August, the maximum stadium capacity was 50%, and there would be "high alert spectator matches".

After that, at the 11th J.League extraordinary executive committee meeting on 20 July, it was announced that the "super strict alert audience game" was extended to 10 August in view of the spread of coronavirus infection.

Changes from the previous season 

2019 season saw two teams promoted to J2 League: Giravanz Kitakyushu won the championship after being for three seasons in the third tier, while Thespakusatsu Gunma won promotion just in the last game of the season. From second division, there was a double automatic relegation for the second time: FC Gifu played their first season in J3 after being in the second division for the last 12 years, when J3 League wasn't even on the cards. Alongside them, an incredible final day of the 2019 season pushed Kagoshima United FC immediately back to J3, just one year after sealing their first-ever participation to the second tier. This is the last J3 League season that featured the U-23 teams from J1 League. On 5 June, FC Tokyo U-23 withdrew from the league.

Also, Japan Football League saw the promotion of another club: after two fifth-placed performances, FC Imabari came third in 2019 and booked their first professional season in their history.

Participating clubs

Personnel and kits

Managerial changes

League table
It was decided on 19 March to change the format regarding the rules for promotion/relegation for the end of the season for the J1, J2 and J3 leagues, such that there would be no relegation this season, that two clubs from the J2 League would be promoted to the 2021 J1 League, and that two clubs from the J3 League would be promoted to the 2021 J2 League (subject to licensing regulations).

FC Tokyo U-23's withdrawal was approved at a board meeting held on 5 June, leaving the J3 League with 18 teams.

Top scorers
After matches played on 20 December 2020.

Attendances

See also
 Japan Football Association (JFA)

 J.League
 2020 J1 League (I)
 2020 J2 League (II)
 2020 J3 League (III)
 2020 Japan Football League (IV)
 2020 Japanese Regional Leagues (V/VI)

 2020 Fuji Xerox Super Cup (Super Cup)
 2020 Emperor's Cup (National Cup)
 2020 J.League YBC Levain Cup (League Cup)

References

External links
Official website, JLeague.jp 

J3 League seasons
3
J3